Easy Beat may refer to:

Easy Beat (album), a 2005 album by Dr. Dog
Easy Beat (BBC radio), a programme broadcast 1960–1967
The Easybeats, an Australian rock band 1964–1969